Stefano Ghisolfi (born February 18, 1993) is an Italian professional rock climber and sport climber. He participates in international climbing competitions in three disciplines: lead, bouldering, and speed, and has had his best results in lead climbing. In December 2018, after climbing Perfecto Mundo, he became the fourth climber in history to redpoint a  route.

Climbing career

Competition climbing
In 2007, Ghisolfi participated in his first international competition: the IFSC European Youth Cup.

Both in 2010 and 2011, he won the bronze medal in Lead climbing at the IFSC World Youth Championships.
In the same years, he also participated in the IFSC World Championships as a senior competitor, for all disciplines (lead, bouldering, and speed) and placed tenth in the overall ranking.

On October 13, 2012, he first got on the podium in the World Cup, obtaining a bronze medal in Xining, China. He obtained gold medals in the World Cup stages at Wujiang (China), in 2014, Xiamen (China), in 2016, and then again at Wujiang (China), in 2017.

Rock climbing
On November 2, 2015 he first ascended Lapsus in Andonno (Italy), a 70-hold route for which he proposed a  grade.

On December 7, 2018, by climbing the  route Perfecto Mundo (Margalef, ESP), he became the fourth climber in history to redpoint a route at that grade, after Adam Ondra, Chris Sharma, and Alex Megos.

This route was the first of the grade, established by Adam Ondra in 2012.

On August 24, 2021, he made the second ascent of Bibliographie, in Céüse, France. Originally graded with a proposed 9c (5.15d) rating, the route was first established by Alex Megos. Ghisolfi then downgraded it to 9b+.

Rankings

Climbing World Cup

Climbing World Championships 
Youth

Adult

Climbing European Championships 
Youth

Adult

Number of medals in the Climbing World Cup

Lead

Number of medals in the Climbing European Youth Cup

Lead

Speed

Rock climbing

Redpointed routes 

:
Perfecto Mundo - Margalef (ESP) - December 7, 2018 - First repeat, first ascent was by Alex Megos, 2018
  - Flatanger (NOR) - September 29, 2020 - First repeat, first ascent was by Adam Ondra, 2012
Bibliographie - Céüse (FRA) - August 24, 2021 - First repeat, first ascent was by Alex Megos, 2020. Originally 9c, Ghisolfi proposed 9b+ instead.
Excalibur - Arco (ITA) - February 5, 2023 - First ascent.

:
 Move Hard - Flatanger (NOR) - September 16, 2022 - First ascent by Adam Ondra, 2017
 L'Arenauta - Sperlonga (ITA) - February 10, 2022 - First ascent.
 The Lonely Mountain - Arco (ITA) - December 17, 2021 - First Ascent.
 Erebor - Arco (ITA) - January 11, 2021 - First Ascent. Originally graded 9b/+, downgraded by Adam Ondra.
La Capella - Siurana (ESP) - January 12, 2018 - First ascent by Adam Ondra, 2011
 One Slap - Arco (ITA) - November 22, 2017 - First ascent by Adam Ondra, 2017
 First Round, First Minute - Margalef (ESP) - January 30, 2017
 Lapsus - Andonno (ITA) - November 2, 2015 - First ascent

:
 La Rambla - Siurana (ESP) - March 20, 2017 
 First Ley - Margalef (ESP) - January 2017 
 Ultimatum - Massone (Arco, (ITA)) - December 19, 2016
 Jungle Boogie - Céüse (FRA) - October 2, 2016
 Realization - Céüse (FRA) - June 21, 2015 - First ascent by Chris Sharma, 2001
 Demencia senil - Margalef (ESP) - March 14, 2015 - First ascent by Chris Sharma, 2009
 La moustache qui fàche - Entraygues (FRA) - August 23, 2014

:
 Thunder Ribes - Massone (Arco, (ITA)) - December 16, 2016 - Combination of the routes Reini's Vibes, Ultima Pietra, and Stonehenge. 
 L'Attimo - Covolo (ITA) - October 11, 2015 - First ascent by Silvio Reffo, 2012
 Underground - Massone (Arco, (ITA)) - July 5, 2014 - First ascent by Manfred Stuffer, 1998
 Biologico - Narango (Arco, (ITA)) - June 8, 2014 - First ascent by Adam Ondra, 2012
 TCT - Gravere (ITA) - May 31, 2014 - First ascent
 Grandi Gesti - Grotta dell'Arenauta (Sperlonga, ITA) - December 30, 2013 - First ascent by Gianluca Daniele, 2009
 Ground Zero - Tetto di Sarre (ITA) - June 9, 2013 - First ascent by Alberto Gnerro, 2002

Onsighted routes 
:
 Fish Eye - Oliana (ESP) - January 8, 2017

:
 Falconeti - Montsant (ESP) - January 2013
 L-mens - Montsant (ESP) - January 2013

Boulder problems 
Ghisolfi climbed five  and two  boulder problems.

He won the 2013, 2014, 2015 and 2016 editions of Melloblocco.

See also 
List of grade milestones in rock climbing
History of rock climbing
Rankings of most career IFSC gold medals

References

External links 

 

Italian rock climbers
Living people
1993 births
Climbers of Fiamme Oro
Competitors at the 2013 World Games
IFSC Climbing World Cup overall medalists